Andreea Bianca Țîrle (born 2 April 2002) is a Romanian handball player who plays as a line player for Minaur Baia Mare and the Romania national team. 

She represented Romania at the 2022 European Championship.

References
  

2002 births
Living people 
Romanian female handball players 
People from Petroșani
SCM Râmnicu Vâlcea (handball) players
CS Minaur Baia Mare (women's handball) players